James Oliver Charles FitzRoy, Earl of Euston FCA (13 December 1947 – 1 October 2009) was the eldest child of the 11th Duke of Grafton and his wife Fortune.

Early life
Born in 1947 to the then Earl of Euston, later the 11th Duke, he was styled Viscount Ipswich and was baptised with Queen Elizabeth The Queen Mother as one of his godparents. He was educated at Eton and Magdalene College, Cambridge, graduating BA in 1973, later promoted to MA.

Career
Between 1973 and 1982, Euston was an assistant director of Schroders (J. Henry Schroder Wagg), an asset management company, and then from 1982 to 1987 an executive director of Enskilda Securities.

Personal life
On 16 September 1972, FitzRoy married Lady Clare Amabel Margaret Kerr, daughter of the 12th Marquess of Lothian and Antonella Kerr, Marchioness of Lothian. They had five children:
 Lady Louise Helen Mary FitzRoy (born 11 June 1973)
 Lady Emily Clare FitzRoy (born 6 December 1974)
 Henry Oliver Charles FitzRoy, 12th Duke of Grafton (born 6 April 1978)
 Lady Charlotte Rose FitzRoy (born 10 March 1983)
 Lady Isobel Anne FitzRoy (born 1985)

In 2003, Euston was living at 6 Vicarage Gardens, Kensington. He died at home on 1 October 2009. His funeral took place at St Genevieve's Church, Euston, on 14 October.

References

1947 births
2009 deaths
James
Pages of Honour
Businesspeople from Suffolk
Alumni of Magdalene College, Cambridge
People educated at Eton College
Courtesy earls
Heirs apparent who never acceded
J